is a Prefectural Natural Park on and around the island of Tonaki, Okinawa Prefecture, Japan. The park was established in 1997 and includes a designated marine zone of 13 km².

See also
 National Parks of Japan
 Iriomote-Ishigaki National Park
 Okinawa Kaigan Quasi-National Park
 Kumejima Prefectural Natural Park
 Irabu Prefectural Natural Park

References

External links
 Detailed map of the Park

Parks and gardens in Okinawa Prefecture
Protected areas established in 1997
1997 establishments in Japan